Rukum Chaurjahari Airport  is a domestic airport located in Chaurjahari serving Western Rukum District, a district in Karnali Province in Nepal.

History
The airport started operations on 24 September 1973.
The airport was renovated and the runway blacktopped in 2014 after previously only having a grass/clay runway. After not having scheduled services for several years, Nepal Airlines resumed services from the airport in 2018.

Facilities

Airlines and destinations

Since the early 2020s, there are no scheduled services to and from Chaurjahari Airport. Previously Nepal Airlines operated routes to Kathmandu and Nepalgunj.

References

External links
 

Airports in Nepal
1973 establishments in Nepal
Buildings and structures in Western Rukum District